Gloria is the second full-length album by the German metal band Disillusion. It was released on October 20, 2006, via Metal Blade Records.

Track listing

Credits
 Vurtox (Andy Schmidt) − vocals, guitars, bass, keyboards
 Rajk Barthel − guitars
 Jens Maluschka − drums

2006 albums
Disillusion (band) albums
Metal Blade Records albums